Tomsk-1 is the main railway station of Tomsk, Russia. It is located on the West Siberian Railway of Russian Railways.

History
With the construction of the Tomsk–Tayga railway line on the site of the station Tomsk-1 was lined up passenger platform Mezeninovka. Over time most of the passengers began to prefer this platform, then Tomsk-2 station, so in 1909 the Tomsk city Duma adopted a decision to rename the Mezeninovka station in Tomsk-1 and Tomsk station in Tomsk-2.

Station building
The station building has been expanded several times and rebuilt. The last time the station was reconstructed in 2001-2004. Construction work began in October 2001, the reconstruction of the station was completed in 2004 for the 400th anniversary of Tomsk.

The station consists of a spacious two-storey building with three entrances and three exits to the trains. For passage to the second way there is an underground passage, which is often closed, as the number of arriving-departing trains can be dispensed one by one.

Trains
Only 5 trains pass the station:
 Tomsk–Moscow
 Tomsk–Anapa
 Tomsk–Leninogorsk
 Tomsk–Novokuznetsk
 Tomsk–Tayga

References

External links
 Photos of Tomsk-1 station

Railway stations in Tomsk Oblast
Railway stations in the Russian Empire opened in 1896
Buildings and structures in Tomsk
Cultural heritage monuments in Tomsk Oblast
Objects of cultural heritage of Russia of regional significance